Bahnhof Meidling  is a station on  of the Vienna U-Bahn. Up until 4 October 2013 it was called Philadelphiabrücke.

Above the U-Bahn station is the Wien Meidling railway station, which is served by long distance and regional trains, and by Vienna S-Bahn lines S1, S2, S3, S60 and S80.

Both stations are located in the Meidling District. The U-Bahn station opened on 7 October 1989. On 15 April 1995 the line was extended further south to Siebenhirten.

References

Buildings and structures in Meidling
Railway stations opened in 1989
Vienna U-Bahn stations

de:U-Bahn-Station Philadelphiabrücke